The 1954 Melbourne Cup was a two-mile handicap horse race which took place on Tuesday, 2 November 1954.

Rising Fast became the first and to date only horse to complete The Spring Grand Slam by winning the Caulfield Cup and Cox Plate before winning the Melbourne Cup which was part of a string of seven straight wins. Behind him was 7/1 shot Hellion by 1 1/4 lengths and 200/1 outsider Gay Helios. The race is also noteworthy because the great racecaller Bill Collins called his first Melbourne Cup.

This is the list of placegetters for the 1954 Melbourne Cup.

See also

 Melbourne Cup
 List of Melbourne Cup winners
 Victoria Racing Club

References

1954
Melbourne Cup
Melbourne Cup
20th century in Melbourne
1950s in Melbourne